Fast Life Yungstaz (also known by its acronym F.L.Y.) is an American hip hop group from Stone Mountain, Georgia. The group is composed of Myko McFly, Vee and Mook.  The group's debut album, Jamboree, was released on June 23, 2009.

Discography

Albums

Mixtapes
 2010: Mile Hi Club (hosted by DJ Pretty Boy Tank and DJ Geronimo)
 2010: Auto-Pilot (hosted by DJ Pretty Boy Tank)

Singles

References

African-American musical groups
American hip hop groups
Def Jam Recordings artists
Musical groups established in 2009
Musical groups from Georgia (U.S. state)
American musical trios
People from Stone Mountain, Georgia
Southern hip hop groups